The traditional music of Mauritius is known as sega music, though reggae, zouk, soukous and other genres are also popular, but the latter genres do not originate from Mauritius, despite famous local singers such as Kaya, who successfully combined Reggae Music to create Mauritian Seggae. Well-known traditional sega singers from Mauritius include Ti Frére, Marlene Ravaton, Serge Lebrasse, Michel Legris and Fanfan.

Musicians in Mauritius are quite talented and through the years Mauritian music has evolved to international standards. There are many jazz and blues artists around the island. 

Sega, seggae and reggae remain the most popular produced music in Mauritius amongst Mauritian artists. Based on popular internet connection there are evolved artists performing R&B, hip hop, soul, dubstep, club, techno and other popular music styles. 

The Sega is usually sung in Creole, the Mauritian mother tongue. Some singers planned to also publish an English version of their Sega songs but later abstained in order to preserve the uniqueness and cultural richness of the local music of Mauritius.

The original instruments - the “Ravanne”, “Triangle”, the “Maravanne” and the traditional guitar - are often replaced by more conventional orchestra instruments. However, all along the coastal fishing villages, the traditional instruments are still being used.

By 2015, some of the popular Mauritian sega artists were Alain Ramanisum, Desiré Francois and Ziakazom. Other top known Mauritian artists are Kaka Zulu and The Prophecy.

Sega
The sega is one of the most popular form of music and dance of Mauritius. The traditional instrumentation includes the ravann, a goat-skin covered drum, the triangle, and the maravann.

It is not clear when sega originated. Most claim that sega music and dance origins are found in the slavery epoch, but research has not established this as a fact. Nowadays, Mauritians sing sega as a form of self-expression. Rural forms of music include Mauritian bhojpuri songs, kawals, that date from the epoch of indentured labour and remained popular in Mauritian villages but are now fast disappearing.

There have been many groups that have been formed that fuse these two as well as others that have a deeper connection to the roots of each genre. Cassiya is an example of a group that has become popular not only in Mauritius but also in the neighboring islands such as Reunion. Their single "Mo fami Peser" gives an idea of how life has evolved for the black indentured laborer post-slavery. It tells about how life as a fisherman becomes more difficult as the seas become more polluted and even though they tried to find a normal city job, they still prefer peaceful life of a fisherman.

Popular sega

Asian music in Mauritius
Indian immigrants have brought their own styles of music and dance, along with instruments like the sitar and tabla. Mauritian-based Bhojpuri music has also been popular with people of Indian-descent, but is now gaining mainstream appeal through the work of artists such as 'Neeraj Gupta Mudhoo' or The Bhojpuri Boys. Their fusion of bhojpuri lyrics, sega beats, and more traditional Indian as well as Bollywood-style music has gained popularity among Mauritians, "Langaroo" being one of their famous songs. Chinese immigrants have also infused Mauritian culture with elements from Chinese musical traditions.

Rock music in Mauritius
Rock music has recently become very popular in Mauritius, many bands have become famous, including XBreed Supersoul, Feedback, Skeptikal, Kelp, Reborn Orlean which is nearer to metal/hard rock. In 2018, with the advent of the Underground Rock Festival initiative, many other bands such as Apostrophe, Devived, UnMind , Revolt and King of None have started to get mainstream recognition.

Musical groups and singers

A list of notable musical groups and singers from Mauritius.

Groups 

 666Armada
 Abaim
 Bhojpuri Boys
 Blackmen Bluz
 Blakkayo
 Cassiya
 Cardiac Rage
 Damien Elisa
 Dylan Grh
 Don Panik
 Double K
 Evolozik
 Gangsta Beach
 Grup Latanier
 Jah Mike
 Kadanse Tropical
 Kreol Jazz Pioneers

 Steel Grooving band
 Mauritian All Stars
 Nas-T Black
 Natty Jah
 Otentik Street Brothers (OSB)
 Reborn Orleans
 Skeptikal
 Solda Kazbad
 Supa Sane
 The Prophecy
 Versaya
 Wake Up Team (WU TEAM)
 Xbreed Supersoul
 Zenfant L'ocean
 ZBS
 Zotsa

Singers 

 Alain Ramanisum
 Alphonse Ravaton (Ti-Frère)
 Bam Cootayen
 Berger Agathe
 Bigg Frankii
 Brinda
 Bruno Raya
 Clarel Armelle
 Claudio Veeraragoo
 Coulouce
 Dagger Killa 
 Dave Dario
 Denis Azor
 Denis Claude Gaspard
 Desiré François
 Didier Clarel
 Dylan Gooriah
 Eric Triton
 Fanfan
 Frico Labelle
 Gassen Singaron (Cozé Mamé)
 Jean Claude Gaspard
 Havana_Brown_
Kenjee Kennedy
 Kaya
 King
 Laura Beg
 Laval Disco
 Linzy Bacbotte
 Mamie Kloune
 Marki Evolution
 Mario Armel

 Mario Ramsamy
 Mario Justin
 Mary Jane Gaspard
 Menwar
 Michel Legris
 Mr Love (Ludovic Lamarque)
 Natty Jah
 Nancy Derouger
 Negro Pou La Vi
 Neeraj Gupta Mudhoo
 Nitin Chinien
 Nitish Joganah
 Ras Natty Baby
 Renel Trapu
 Sandra Mayotte
 Serge Lebrasse
 Siven Chinien
 Sky To Be (Jean Patrice Kevin Dina)
 Sona Noyan
 Suchita Ramdin
 Sylvain Kaleecharan
 System R
 Tian Corentin 
 Vishnu Carombayeni
 Yoan Catherine
 ZENO
 Ziakazom
 Zulu

See also
 Sega music
 Seggae
 Santé engagé
 :Category:Mauritian singers
 :Category:Mauritian musicians
 :Category:Mauritian musical instruments

References
Ewens, Graeme and Werner Graebner. "A Lightness of Touch". 2000. In Broughton, Simon and Ellingham, Mark with McConnachie, James and Duane, Orla (Ed.), World Music, Vol. 1: Africa, Europe and the Middle East, pp 505–508. Rough Guides Ltd, Penguin Books.